Heligmomerus taprobanicus, is a species of spider of the genus Heligmomerus. It is endemic to Sri Lanka.

See also
 List of Idiopidae species

References

Idiopidae
Spiders described in 1892
Endemic fauna of Sri Lanka
Spiders of Asia